Dhari may refer to:

Places
 Dhari, Gujarat, India
Dhari Junction railway station
Dhari (Vidhan Sabha constituency)
 Dhari, Nepal

People
Harith al-Dhari (1941–2015), an Iraqi Sunni Arab cleric 
Jamal al-Dhari (born 1965), a leader of the al-Zoba tribe in Iraq
Dhari Ali al-Fayadh (c. 1918 – 2005), an Iraqi Member of Parliament 
Dhari Almutairi, a Kuwaiti paralympic athlete
Dhari Malla, king of the Mallabhum 1554–1565 
Dhari Hambir Malla Dev, or Dhari Hambeera, king of the Mallabhum 1620–1626
Dhari Said (born 1987), a Kuwaiti footballer

Other uses
 Dhari (headdress), an elaborate dancer's headdress used by Torres Strait Islander men

See also

Dari (disambiguation)
Dhadi (disambiguation)